The 1917 Colgate football team was an American football team that represented Colgate University as an independent during the 1917 college football season. In its first and only season under head coach Harold McDevitt, the team compiled a 4–2 record and outscored opponents by a total of 118 to 40. Charles Hubbell was the team captain. The team played its home games on Whitnall Field in Hamilton, New York.

Schedule

References

Colgate
Colgate Raiders football seasons
Colgate football